

Medalists
The original medalists were the following.

After the disqualification of the Russian women, the medalists were the following.

Heats

Final

References
Results

1500 metres at the World Athletics Indoor Championships
1500 metres Women
2008 in women's athletics